Casey Township may refer to the following townships

in the United States:
 Casey Township, Clark County, Illinois

in Canada:
 Casey, Ontario, township in the Timiskaming District